Bangladesh, with an area of 147,570 km2, features a flood plain landscape and several river systems throughout the country. This landscape provides the major natural resources of water, land, fisheries, forests, and wildlife. The country currently faces several environmental issues which threaten these resources, including groundwater metal contamination, increased groundwater salinity, cyclones and flooding, and sedimentation and changing patterns of stream flow due to watershed mismanagement. Some of these, such as the changing patterns of stream flow and presence of lead in groundwater, can be directly correlated with human activity and industrial processes, while others, such as cyclones and flooding are naturally occurring issues. Many of these issues are further exacerbated by climate change, which causes increased occurrence of storms and cyclones and rising sea levels. According to the Notre Dame Global Adaptation Index, Bangladesh is the 43rd most vulnerable country to the effects of climate change, and the 37th least prepared country to address these effects. There has been some government actions taken to address these issues.

Groundwater contamination 
Groundwater in Bangladesh, which is used as drinking water, is found to be contaminated with many heavy metals, including arsenic, lead, cadmium, chromium, copper, mercury, nickel, and uranium. Of these, arsenic has been determined to be the most significant health issue, with about 49% of the water being likely contaminated with concentrations above the WHO guidelines, affecting 35 to 77 million people within the country. Arsenic contamination of shallow groundwater is a natural occurring problem that has been further made worse by the use of tube wells, which extract groundwater. Since the 1970s, the government started instituting the use of shallow tube wells to avoid the consumption of surface water, which is often contaminated with various bacteria. These tube wells, however, reached the arsenic-contaminated groundwater. This issue is more prevalent in inland areas and for rural areas, where 97% of the population uses tube wells. Health effects of consumption of arsenic-contaminated water include skin pigmentation changes and lesions, which could be a precursor to skin cancer. It can also cause lung and bladder consumption, as well as developmental effects, neurotoxicity, diabetes, pulmonary disease and cardiovascular disease.

Lead contamination has been found to be high in areas around Dhaka. It has been postulated that this is due to the many industries in the area, including battery recycling facilities. The Department of Environment found more than 1200 industrial sites that caused significant pollution. Reasons for the additional metal contamination include mining and agricultural activity. The presence of lead in the water affects the environment, as well as human health. The presence of lead in soil also led to a concentration of lead in the leaves of plants grown in the area.

In coastal areas, the heavy metal contamination has also had an effect in marine life and the local ecology. This, in turn, affects the economic output of the region that relies partly on aquaculture. For instance, high levels of metals may affect the reproductive capabilities of the native ecology or contaminate the fish. If the fish have too high levels of metals, a fisher may not be able to sell it for consumption. If a consumer eats fish with high levels of metal contamination, he is at risk for health issues, such as cancer, kidney failure, or various metal poisoning. There is also a possibility that fish will move further away from these areas, to avoid the toxic areas, which would also affect the livelihood of the fishermen in the area.

There has been some effort by the government to provide deeper tube wells that are clearly marked as arsenic free, as well as by various NGOs to provide filters to remove the heavy metal contaminants.

Groundwater salinity 
In the coastal regions of Bangladesh, which make up 32% of the land in the country, there are problems of salinity due to high tides and reduced flow in rivers during the dry season. There is already a natural seasonal fluctuation of rising levels of salt water. During the dry season, a salt water front rises 240 km. This affects the salinity of the groundwater in the countryside. This effect is predicted to be more severe in the future because of climate change, because of rising sea levels. As a result, sea water will leak further into freshwater zones, which will have a broad reaching effect on the flora and fauna of the region that depends on the presence of fresh water. For example, if the sea level rises 88 cm, the water 40 km inland will be contaminated with a 5 ppt saline front. This would specifically affect the only freshwater region of the Tetulia River, the Meghna Estuary. The salinity level in the Meghna Estuary, the largest estuarine system in Bangladesh, may become too high to sustain agriculture and pisciculture. It could also lead to the extinction of some of the endangered species of the Estuary.

In addition to affecting the natural flora and fauna of regions of coastal Bangladesh, increased salinity could also affect the soil salinity, and therefore the agriculture output of the regions. This trend has already been seen in coastal regions like Satkhira, where the net area of cultivated land decreased by 7% from 1996 to 2008. Rice production was particular affected, decreasing from 0.3 million tons to 0.1 million tons from 2008 to 2010. If the sea levels rise as predicted in a "moderate" climate scenario, Bangladesh is predicted to produce 0.2 million fewer crops. This number is predicted to be doubled for a "severe" climate scenario. This issue affects both the economic stability of regions that rely mostly on rice growth for income and the lifestyle and eating habits of a region that relies on a rice-based diet. Additionally, poorer families tend to be disproportionately affected by the issue of groundwater salinity.

Cyclones and flooding 

The coastal region of Bangladesh is especially prone to cyclones. Between 1793 and 1996, there has been one cyclone about every 4.5 years. This has a detrimental effect on the local environment, as well as on families and their property. For instance, a cyclone that hit in 1970 caused 300,000 deaths and US$86.4 million of property damage. Cyclones can detrimentally affect the food production of the area. In 1991, a cyclone caused the destruction of 60% of the cattle stock in the affected area, 80% of the poultry stock in the affected area, and exposed 72,000 ha of rice paddies to salt water.

Cyclones can cause storm surges, which further affect those who live in coastal areas. Furthermore, it adds to the flooding that the area is already prone to. 20 to 22% of the land is flooded between June and October. Studies by the International Panel on Climate Change (IPCC) have shown that climate change and the resulting rising sea levels would further exacerbate this. For example, a 45 cm increase in sea level would result in 75% of the mangrove forest area being flooded. Furthermore, increased sedimentation in the watersheds may lead to more flooding.

Flooding has been cited as one of the "main obstacle[s] to the economic improvement of the nation". It affects the agricultural economy and the food security of the nation, since almost 74% of the land is cultivated. If significant portions of this land becomes flooded, it cannot be used for to produce agricultural products. Flooding tends to disproportionately affect the poorer more, with the poor being 2.5 times more likely to be "severely distress[ed]" during flooding than the wealthy.

Watershed management 
The effect of increased human and animal population, as well as land use in the Himalayan Mountains have caused soil erosion, which could have resulted in the extra deposition of sediments in the Bangladesh watersheds. This may have effects on the soil composition near the watershed and the propensity of the area to flood. While Eckholm and Myers have proposed a now popular theory that there is a direct causal relationship between deforestation in Nepal and higher flooding in the Bangladesh watersheds, there is not enough evidence to determine whether or not this is true. Improper watershed management does lead to sedimentation in reservoirs and changing patterns of stream flow. Sedimentation in reservoirs effects the turbidity of the reservoir, and erosion patterns along the river. It also presents a cost to the government who has to dredge the rivers of its sediments. In Bangladesh, the government has to remove 0.8 million cubic meters of maintenance dredging and 2 million cubic meters of capital dredging per year. Since scientists do not unanimously agree the degree to which watershed management affects patterns of stream flow and flooding, it is difficult determine the extent of this effect.

Government response to environmental issues 
In a study on the popular response to climate change, Bahauddin et al. found that many citizens had heard of climate change, but often thought it simply meant the symptoms of climate change (i.e. flooding, storms, drought). The likelihood that a respondent noticed the effects of climate change seemed dependent on whether or not the person's livelihood was sensitive to the climate. Many of the respondents believed that a governmental "safety net program" could be a possible solution to climate change.

In response to the environmental issues that the country faces, the Bangladeshi government formed the Ministry of Environment and Forests (MoEF) in 1989, which addresses these issues and considers the role of climate change in the country's development. MoEF oversees the Department of Environment and Forest Department, which enforce environmental law and protect the natural biodiversity in the country respectively. In Bahauddin's study, they round many citizens were not aware of any plans, governmental or non-governmental, to address the effect of climate change.

There has also been efforts by local government to address climate change related issues. For instance, some local governments have invested in shelters to reduce cyclone-related mortalities.
People's perception on impact of salinity on trees and agricultural crops in the coastal area of Bangladesh shows salinity negatively affects the growth of plant species greatly.

Forests
Bangladesh had a 2018 Forest Landscape Integrity Index mean score of 5.45/10, ranking it 101st globally out of 172 countries.

References

 
Economy of Bangladesh
Environment of Bangladesh
Politics of Bangladesh